Kokan Cooperative Housing Society is one of the neighborhoods of Gulshan Town in Karachi, Sindh, Pakistan.

Most of the population in the Kokan Cooperative Housing Society belong to the Konkani Muslim community.

See also
 Gulistan-e-Jauhar

References

External links 
 Karachi Website.
 http://wikimapia.org/#lat=24.910824&lon=67.1420002&z=16&l=0&m=b

Neighbourhoods of Karachi
Gulshan Town
Pakistani people of Konkani descent